Project HOPE (Health Opportunities for People Everywhere) is an international global health and humanitarian aid non-governmental organization founded in the United States in 1958. Project HOPE works in five main areas: disasters and health crises; infectious diseases; noncommunicable diseases; maternal, neonatal and child health; and health policy. The organization has been led by President and CEO Rabih Torbay since 2019. 

Project HOPE helps different developing countries in efforts to eradicate infectious diseases like HIV/AIDS and tuberculosis. They also help educate parents on how to prevent and treat diseases for their children and themselves, and also train health professionals. 
Project HOPE also sets up village health banks, which give small loans to women so they can improve their health and family's health. 

Project HOPE is headquartered in Washington, D.C.

Ukraine Response 
Project HOPE began working in Ukraine in 2002 with a life-skills program focused on drug use prevention, HIV prevention, and education for children in primary schools. In 2007, Project HOPE began a five-year, USAID-funded HIV/AIDS Service Capacity project in Ukraine focused on community mobilization for the country’s most at-risk populations.

From 2012-2017, Project HOPE helped improve the health of Ukrainians by enabling the Government of Ukraine to decrease the burden of TB and lower TB morbidity and mortality.

Following Russia's invasion of Ukraine in February 2022, Project HOPE launched a response within Ukraine and in the neighboring countries of Moldova, Poland, and Romania to provide health and humanitarian assistance to Ukrainians, including refugees fleeing the invasion. 

Project HOPE has since delivered more than 300 pallets of medicines and medical supplies inside Ukraine, including trauma supplies, insulin, needles, hygiene kits, and more; launched multiple mobile medical units (MMUs) to provide primary health care to populations impacted by the violence; provided a trauma training course for trauma surgeons and students in Ukrainian health facilities; and completed multiple reconstruction projects in hospitals in Irpin and Bucha cities.

COVID-19 Response 
Project HOPE launched a global response to the COVID-19 pandemic to support frontline health care workers, expand vaccine access, and provide medical surge support where needed.

Project HOPE and the Center for Human Rights and Humanitarian Studies at the Watson Institute of Brown University developed and released a self-paced eLearning for health care professionals, as well as a “Training-of-Trainers” model to provide the critical skills and knowledge necessary for health workers to respond rapidly and efficiently to COVID-19 in their workplaces and communities, while protecting their own health.

Through a program funded by the U.S. Health Resources and Services Administration, Project HOPE is working within five high-priority states of Florida, Alabama, Louisiana, Texas and Georgia to provide resources, training, and support to CHWs to educate and assist individuals in receiving COVID-19 vaccinations, with a focus on vulnerable and medically underserved communities, including racial and ethnic minority groups. Project HOPE has engaged a network of Free and Charitable Clinics and Federally Qualified Health Centers in these 37 counties with the highest unvaccinated but willing populations, to implement the outreach work and engage the community.

Project HOPE has activated its global roster of medical volunteers to provide staff surge capacity and mobile testing in hard-hit areas including Houston; Chicago; Navajo Nation; and Montgomery County, Maryland.

History
Project HOPE's founding began with the SS HOPE, the first peacetime hospital ship (converted from the USS Consolation (AH-15)). Project HOPE's founding and early years received strong support from private sector businesses and the U.S. government.

The SS HOPE was retired in 1974, after sailing to Indonesia, South Vietnam, Peru, Ecuador, Guinea, Nicaragua, Colombia, Ceylon (Sri Lanka), Tunisia, Jamaica, and Brazil.  On these voyages doctors, nurses, and technical staff provided medical care and training to people in each country visited. 

The SS HOPE was not replaced, and emphasis switched entirely to land-based operations.

Locations of Programs 
Project HOPE has active programs in the following locations:

Africa
 Ethiopia 
 Malawi
 Namibia
 Nigeria
 Sierra Leone
 South Africa
 Zambia

The Americas 
 The Bahamas 
 Colombia
 Dominican Republic
 Ecuador 
 Haiti
 Honduras
 Mexico
 United States

Asia and the Pacific
 China
 Indonesia
 Philippines

Central and Eastern Europe
 Kosovo
 North Macedonia
 Moldova 
 Poland
 Romania
 Ukraine

Middle East
 Egypt
 Yemen

Navy Missions 2009
 Antigua
 Colombia
 Dominican Republic
 El Salvador
 Ghana
 Haiti
 Kiribati
 Liberia
 Marshall Islands
 Nicaragua
 Panama
 Solomon Islands
 Tonga
 Vietnam
 Western Samoa

Recent events 
2005 — When Hurricane Katrina hit the Gulf Coast, HOPE sent volunteer medical response teams to the area, where they provided nursing care to people in need.
2006 — HOPE continues to provide aid to the people on the Gulf Coast who were hit by Hurricane Katrina. In the spring of 2006, they helped staff the U.S. Navy hospital ship, known as the Mercy, with volunteer physicians and nurses to South Asia.
2008 — Project HOPE's Chief Operations Officer, C. William Fox Jr., BG, USA (Ret.), was injured by an IED in Basra where the organization was assisting in building a new Children's Hospital.
2010 — In response to the January earthquake in Haiti, Project HOPE helped to coordinate volunteer medical staffers to fill out the complement of the USNS Comfort.
2020 — In response to the Beirut explosion, Project HOPE deployed an emergency response team to deliver necessary medical supplies and other needed support and aid.
2020 — In response to COVID-19, Project HOPE and the Center for Human Rights and Humanitarian Studies at the Watson Institute of Brown University developed and released a self-paced eLearning for health care professionals, as well as a “Training-of-Trainers” model to provide the critical skills and knowledge necessary for health workers to respond rapidly and efficiently to COVID-19 in their workplaces and communities, while protecting their own health.
2022 — In response to the Russian invasion of Ukraine, Project HOPE sent medical supplies to help Ukrainian refugees. 
2022 -- In response to COVID-19, Project HOPE improved access to COVID-19 vaccines through free and charitable clinics in the U.S. through a new program funded by the Health Resources and Services Administration, an agency of the Department of Health and Human Services.

Notable Support 
In July 2022, the American musician Post Malone hosted an Apex Legends charity stream called "Gaming for Love" that raised over $58,000 for Project HOPE. In October 2021, former Bachelorette contestant Ben Higgins joined Project HOPE's Board of Directors.

Collectible card
In October 2020, the digital collectible cards company Phil Ropy created a card with American photographer Elliott Erwitt to raise awareness for Project HOPE’s COVID-19 response. The picture on the card shows a pair of medical rubber gloves as a reminder of how exposed health care workers are and as an allusion to Project HOPE's logo. The proceeds from the sales of the card are redistributed to the organization.

See also
Mercy Ships

References

External links 
Project HOPE web page
Project HOPE: Forty Years of American Medicine Abroad
Parade Magazine article
Charity Navigator Profile of Project HOPE

Health charities in the United States
Organizations established in 1958
International charities
1958 establishments in the United States
Hospital ships
Global health
Non-governmental organizations
Humanitarian aid organizations